Adiscanthus is a genus of flowering plants belonging to the family Rutaceae.

Its native range is northern South America.

Species:

Adiscanthus fusciflorus

References

Zanthoxyloideae
Zanthoxyloideae genera
Taxa named by Adolpho Ducke